Ashton James Eaton (born January 21, 1988) is a retired American decathlete and two-time Olympic champion, who holds the world record in the indoor heptathlon event.  Eaton was the second decathlete (after Roman Šebrle) to break the 9,000-point barrier in the decathlon, with 9,039 points, a score he bettered on August 29, 2015, when he beat his own world record with a score of 9,045 points, and remains the only person to exceed 9000 points twice. His world record was broken by Frenchman Kevin Mayer on September 16, 2018, with a total of 9,126 points, who became the third man to pass the 9,000-point barrier.

He competed for the Oregon Track Club Elite team based in Eugene, Oregon. In college, Eaton competed for the University of Oregon, where he was a five-time NCAA champion, and won The Bowerman award in 2010. In 2011, Eaton won the first international medal of his career, a silver, in the decathlon at the 2011 World Championships. The following year, Eaton broke his own world record in the heptathlon at the 2012 World Indoor Championships, and then broke the world record in the decathlon at the Olympic Trials. After setting the world record, Eaton won the gold medal at the 2012 Summer Olympics in London. He successfully defended his Olympic title in Rio 2016 by winning the decathlon gold medal and tying the Olympic record. Eaton is only the third Olympian (after Bob Mathias of the US and Great Britain's Daley Thompson) to achieve back-to-back gold medals in the decathlon.

He announced his retirement from the sport just a few months later on January 3, 2017.

Personal life
Eaton was born in Portland, Oregon, on January 21, 1988, the only child of Roslyn Eaton and Terrance Wilson. His father is Black and his mother is Caucasian.

His maternal grandfather, Jim Eaton, played football at Michigan State University, and his father also played the sport. His mother was an athlete and a dancer. He has three paternal siblings, including Verice Bennett, a first sergeant in the United States Marine Corps, who received the Silver Star in December 2011 for serving with valor in Afghanistan.

Eaton's parents separated when he was two years old. His mother, Roslyn, moved to La Pine, Oregon. He was athletic from a young age, competing in football, basketball, running, soccer, wrestling, and he earned a black belt in taekwondo. When Eaton was in the fifth grade, he and his mother relocated to Bend, Oregon, where he later attended Mountain View High School. Interested in track and field, he was coached by Tate Metcalf and John Nosler. Only a few colleges recruited Eaton. He considered playing football at a Division III college. In the spring of 2006, Metcalf asked Eaton if he would consider the decathlon while in college. Metcalf suggested that Eaton attend a university with a strong decathlon program, and Eaton chose the University of Oregon.

Eaton married his University of Oregon teammate, Canadian multi-event athlete Brianne Theisen, on July 15, 2013, one year after both competed in the London Olympics. The two first met in 2006 during Eaton's freshman year at Oregon and fell in love at the 2007 Pan American Junior Athletics Championships, held in Brazil: Theisen won the gold medal for Canada and then followed Eaton to enroll at the University of Oregon. Since retirement Ashton and Brianne have explored moving from Eugene to San Francisco.

Collegiate career
Eaton was initially coached at Oregon by Dan Steele, the associate director of track and a former decathlete. Under Steele, Eaton rapidly improved in the 1500 m, high jump, hurdles, and pole vault. After Steele left in 2010 to coach at the University of Northern Iowa, the university hired decathlon coach Harry Marra (who had trained Olympic decathletes Dan O'Brien and Dave Johnson) to further develop Eaton's skills.

In his first year as an Oregon Duck 2006–07, he was one of only three freshmen nationwide to qualify provisionally for NCAAs in the combined events, both indoors and outdoors. Finished second in Pac-10 Championships decathlon with a season-best 7,123 points in only his second career decathlon. He then placed third at the USA Junior Championships decathlon (7,155 points) and second in the long jump (24-0.25), the latter of which earned him a trip to Brazil for the 2007 Pan American Junior Championships.

In 2008, Eaton won the decathlon at the NCAA Men's Outdoor Track and Field Championship.

In 2009, Eaton defended his decathlon title at the NCAA Championships to win with 8,241 points. He also won the heptathlon title at the 2009 NCAA Indoor Championships with 5,988 points. Eaton won the Division I field athlete of the year award in 2009.

At the 2010 NCAA Indoor Championships, Eaton broke the heptathlon world record with a score of 6,499, eclipsing Dan O'Brien's 17-year-old mark by 23 points. In June 2010, he won his third consecutive NCAA decathlon title by finishing first in the decathlon with a personal best of 8,457 points. He was the first male athlete to win 3 consecutive titles in the decathlon. In 2010, Eaton won The Bowerman, given annually to the best male and female U.S. collegiate track and field athletes. Eaton graduated from the University of Oregon the same year.

International career

2008–2009
At the 2008 United States Olympic Trials, Eaton placed fifth overall with 8,122 points.

At the 2009 USA Outdoor Track and Field Championships, Eaton placed second in the decathlon behind Trey Hardee with 8,075 points. This earned him a place at the 2009 World Championships in Athletics, in Berlin, where he finished 18th with 8,061 points.

2011–2012
Eaton improved his own world record in the indoor heptathlon at the International Indoor Combined Events Meeting in Tallinn in February 2011. Despite under-performing in the high jump he managed a score of 6568 points.

In August 2011, at the 2011 World Championships in Athletics, Eaton won the silver medal in the decathlon competition with a final points tally of 8505, losing first place to his compatriot Trey Hardee.

In March 2012, at the 2012 IAAF World Indoor Championships held in Istanbul, Eaton won the gold medal in the heptathlon competition with a new world record 6645, winning five events (60 m, 60 m hurdles, long jump, pole vault and 1000 m) out of seven and finished third for the rest (high jump and shot put). His stand-out events were the Long Jump (scoring 1,102 points with a jump of 8.16m/26' 9-1/4") and the final event, the 1,000 m run, where he set a Championship record of 2:32.78 (only one-tenth of a second off his personal best time). He defeated silver medal winner Oleksiy Kasyanov by 574 points (6071).

2012 Summer Olympics

Trials
At the 2012 United States Olympic Trials, the qualifying meet for the 2012 Summer Olympics, Eaton started day one of the decathlon competition with two world decathlon bests, the equivalent of a world record for athletes competing in a full decathlon. The first in the 100-meter (10.21), and then in the long jump. To emphasize the quality of Eaton's first two marks, the 100-meter time equaled the minimum (season wide) time required for men to qualify for the trials 100-meter race and only .03 short of the Olympic "A" standard. The long jump was  farther than the top qualifier in the long jump preliminary round held that same day at the trials,  beyond the "A" standard, and would have tied for second in the final. He went on to finish fifth in the shot put, first in the high jump, and first in the 400 m (46.70) held in a pouring rainstorm. After day one, Eaton's points total of 4728 was more than 300 points ahead of second-place competitor Trey Hardee. On the second day of competition, Eaton finished first in the 110-meter hurdles with a time of 13.70. In the discus, however, he had an eighth-place finish. Going into the final event, the 1500 m run, Eaton held a 317-point lead over his closest competitor, Hardee. Eaton ran a new personal best in the 1500 m with a time of 4:14.48, finishing first. In the process, he brought his total score for the decathlon to 9039, breaking Roman Šebrle's previous world record of 9026 points. Eaton broke Dan O'Brien's American record of 8891 points set in 1992.

Olympics
At the 2012 Olympics, Eaton's primary rival was (now) teammate Trey Hardee. Eaton's 10.35 100 m was the top time of the day, with Hardee the next best. His 8.03 long jump was almost half a metre farther than any other competitor, building him a sizeable lead. His 14.66 shot put was just 12 cm short of his personal record. And his 2.05 high jump tied with several members of the field for second best. In the final first day event his 46.90 400 metres was over a full second faster than anybody else in the field. His first day total was 4661, with a 220-point lead over Hardee.

Day two started with a virtual tie between Hardee and Eaton, Eaton getting 13.56 in the 110m hurdles. Eaton's discus throw of 42.53 gave up almost 6 metres and 120 points to Hardee, but by that point Eaton still had a 100-point lead. Eaton more than gained that back with a 5.20 pole vault, the third best competition. In the javelin throw Hardee pulled back 70 points with a good throw, but this advantage was limited by Eaton setting a new personal best of 61.96. With Eaton holding a 150+ point lead and a superior personal record in the 1500 m over Hardee, the medals were already determined. Nobody made a serious run at improving his position, and Eaton just went through the formality of completing the event in 4:33.59 to take the gold medal.

2013 World Championships
Eaton won the 2013 world title in the decathlon with an 8809-point performance in Moscow.

2014 World Indoor Championships

In a February 2014 interview with Track & Field News (Vol. 67, no. 3), Eaton - and his coach Harry Marra - said 2014 would be a "rest" year, with no decathlon competitions. His only multi-event would be the heptathlon at World Indoors, which he entered having broken the world record in his last 3 consecutive indoor competitions. Eaton won the gold medal in the Heptathlon at the 2014 IAAF World Indoor Championships held in Sopot, Poland on 7 & 8 March 2014. As the defending champion he received an automatic entry and did not have to enter a qualifying meet. He opened the competition at the 15th world indoor championships at Ergo Arena with his fastest time ever for the 60 m, 6.66 seconds and never trailed. He followed that up with an excellent long jump, a good shot put and an excellent high jump (2.06m/6' 9") for a first day score of 3,653, which was just a single point less than when he set the Heptathlon record at the 2012 World Indoor meet. On Day 2, he opened with an outstanding time of 7.64 in the 60 m hurdles - a Championship meet record - and an excellent pole vault of 5.20m/17' 0-3/4". He won the 1,000 m by 3 seconds, however his time of 2:34.72 was 2 seconds slower than in 2012 and he fell 13 points short of his world record. His total of 6,632 points ranks as #2 all-time. Andrei Krauchanka of Belarus was 2nd with a new national record of 6,303 points, and Belgium's Thomas Van Der Plaetsen was 3rd with 6,259 (also a Belgian national record.)

Eaton told Track & Field News that during the 2014 outdoor season he planned to run some 400 m hurdles races for the first time in his career, as means of "doing something fun" while building his stamina for the 400 and 1,500 in future decathlon competitions. He also hoped to compete in some (world class) Diamond League meets in (variously) the 100 m, 110 m hurdles and/or the long jump. After resting from the grueling grind of decathlon training in 2014, Eaton would resume a program aimed at defending his titles at the 2015 Worlds in Beijing, China, the 2016 IAAF World Indoor Championships in Portland, Oregon, and the 2016 Summer Olympics in Rio de Janeiro, Brazil.

2015 World Championships
Eaton won the 2015 world title in the decathlon improving his own world record with a 9045-point performance in Beijing.

Major competition record

Personal bests

Outdoor

 World record
 Decathlon best

Indoor

.

 World record
 Heptathlon best

World records

See also
 Decathlon world record progression
 Men's heptathlon world record progression

References

External links

 Ashton Eaton at Decathlon 2000
 
 
 
 
 
 
 Ashton Eaton at University of Oregon Ducks
 

1988 births
African-American male track and field athletes
American male decathletes
American people of English descent
Athletes (track and field) at the 2012 Summer Olympics
Athletes (track and field) at the 2016 Summer Olympics
Living people
Medalists at the 2012 Summer Olympics
Medalists at the 2016 Summer Olympics
Olympic gold medalists for the United States in track and field
Oregon Ducks men's track and field athletes
Track and field athletes from Portland, Oregon
World Athletics Championships athletes for the United States
World Athletics Championships medalists
World Athletics record holders
World Athletics indoor record holders
Olympic decathletes
Track & Field News Athlete of the Year winners
USA Outdoor Track and Field Championships winners
USA Indoor Track and Field Championships winners
World Athletics Indoor Championships winners
World Athletics Championships winners
21st-century African-American sportspeople
20th-century African-American people